was a Japanese animation studio based in Suginami, Tokyo and active from 2002 to 2015. The studio was formed on February 7, 2002 by Sunrise producers Shinichirō Kobayashi and Takashi Kochiyama. Manglobe filed for bankruptcy in September 2015 after getting in an estimated debt of 350 million yen.

Studio production
Manglobe made its name producing original shows such as Samurai Champloo and Ergo Proxy, rather than adaptations of existing works. Since 2010, the studio had been responsible for multiple seasons of the anime adaptation of The World God Only Knows. Writer of The World God Only Knows manga Tamiki Wakaki became good friends with Manglobe's managing director Takashi Kochiyama during this period, and had stated that working closely with Manglobe's staff resulted in "a truly fortunate work."

Bankruptcy
On September 29, 2015, the studio filed for bankruptcy and removed its website. The Anime! Anime! Biz website reported that the studio had been insolvent for some time, and it had considered options such as debt consolidation before deciding to file for bankruptcy. According to a report by Teikoku Databank, Manglobe had an estimated debt of 350 million yen. Manglobe's bankruptcy resulted in a delay of the theatrical release of the film Genocidal Organ, which had been slated to open on November 13, 2015, and a 16-month long delay of the home video release of Gangsta from Volume 3 onwards in Japan.

Works

TV series

Others
Trip Trek (ONA, 2003)
Sengoku BASARA (Game – Cut scenes, 2005)
Dante's Inferno: An Animated Epic (Film – Segment "Limbo", 2010)
Hayate the Combat Butler: Heaven is a Place on Earth (Film, 2011)
Shinken Zemi Kōkō Kōza (OVA, 2012)
Genocidal Organ (Film, 2017; production taken over by Geno Studio after bankruptcy)

References

External links

 
Japanese animation studios
Animation studios in Tokyo
Mass media companies established in 2002
Suginami
Mass media companies disestablished in 2015
Companies that have filed for bankruptcy in Japan
Defunct mass media companies of Japan
Japanese companies disestablished in 2015
Japanese companies established in 2002